XHAS may refer to:

 XHAS-TV, an Azteca America affiliate licensed to Tijuana, Baja California
 XHAS-FM, a Regional Mexican in Nuevo Laredo, Tamaulipas